Mari Leinan Lund (born 28 May 1999) is a Norwegian nordic combined skier who represents Tolga IL. She took the silver medal in women's nordic combined at the inaugural World Championship race, individual normal hill/5 km, at the FIS Nordic World Ski Championships 2021.

Her younger sister Marte Leinan Lund is also a nordic combined skier.

Career
Leinan Lund competed in the first ever women's nordic combined World Cup race in Ramsau on 18 December 2020 where she finished 7th. At the FIS Nordic World Ski Championships 2021 she took the silver medal in the women's first ever race at a world championship. She shared the podium with her sister Marte Leinan Lund and the winner, fellow Norwegian Gyda Westvold Hansen.

Nordic combined results
All results are sourced from the International Ski Federation (FIS).

World Championships
 1 medal – (1 silver)

World Cup

Season standings

References

External links

1999 births
Living people
Norwegian female Nordic combined skiers
FIS Nordic World Ski Championships medalists in Nordic combined
21st-century Norwegian women